Ja'far Kashfi, Iranian Muslim philosopher, was born at Darabgard in Fars in 1775 or 1776, lived all his life at Borujerd and died in 1850–1851. His work comprises about twelve titles, and is written in both Persian and Arabic. His great work in Persian entitled Tuhfat al-muluk (The Gift offered to the Sovereigns), which was written at the request of a Qajar prince, son of Fath Ali Shah, the Shahzadah Muhammad-Taqi Mirza.

Notes

References

19th-century Iranian philosophers
Islamic philosophers
19th-century Muslim scholars of Islam
Iranian Shia scholars of Islam
1770s births
1850s deaths
People from Fars Province
People of Qajar Iran